An extensive collection of parks and greenways exists in Huntsville, Alabama for the public's recreational use.

Parks

Parks within Huntsville city limits
The city of Huntsville currently has 57 parks which cover over 3,000 acres of land.

Proposed parks
Capshaw Road Park
Zierdt Road Park

Current greenways

Aldridge Creek Greenway
Aldridge Creek Greenway is a 103.55-acre greenway consisting of a  walking and biking trail in South Huntsville that runs along Aldridge Creek connecting Ken Johnston Park to Ditto Landing and the Tennessee River. The greenway runs north along Aldridge Creek from the main trailhead for 1.25 miles to the sidewalk on the west side of Bailey Cove Road just north of Country Lane Drive and south to the entrance of Ditto Landing, about 3.5 miles. The address of the park is 1100 Mountain Gap Road at Ken Johnston Park just west of Bailey Cove Road. Parking is also available on the south end of the greenway at Ditto Landing and additional parking is located behind Challenger School on Chaney Thompson Road.

The city had planned to continue the greenway north to connect to Atwood Linear Park Greenway. However, Valley Hill Country Club will not allow the city to expand the greenway through their golf course. The city has plans to construct future segments of the greenway from the current north terminus to the east end of Esslinger Road.

Atwood Linear Park Greenway
Atwood Linear Park Greenway is a  trail that connects Jones Family Park to the Valley Hill Country Club. The trail is a multi-use walking and biking trail that runs along Atwood Drive in the Jones Valley area of Southeast Huntsville. Parking is available at Jones Family Park on the north side of Four Mile Post Road.

Big Cove Creek Greenway
Big Cove Creek Greenway is a 53-acre greenway in southeast Huntsville's Hampton Cove subdivision that runs along Big Cove Creek north to just south of Caldwell Lane. The city of Huntsville plans to extend the greenway north to Monte Sano Mountain and connect it to the existing Arrowhead trail.

Flint River Greenway
The Flint River Greenway is one of the newest greenways in the city of Huntsville. It is located in southeast Huntsville in the Hampton Cove subdivision. Currently, there is a  walking and biking trail connecting Old US 431 to the Big Cove Creek Greenway in the Hays Nature Preserve where parking is available. The city of Huntsville plans to extend the greenway south along the Flint River to eventually connect to the Tennessee River greenway.

Gateway Greenway
Parking is available along Meridian Street.

Indian Creek Greenway

Indian Creek Greenway is a series of greenways that make up  of walking and biking trails in West Huntsville. The north section of the greenway is located in the Providence subdivision off of University Drive. Parking is available at the trail heads at Creekwood Park and off Old Madison Pike east of Slaughter Road.

Little Cove Road Greenway 
The greenway travels along Little Cove Road/Eastern Bypass/Old Hwy 431.

Tennessee River Greenway
The Tennessee River Greenway connects to the Aldridge Creek Greenway at Ditto Landing in South Huntsville and adds an additional  of walking and biking trail that runs along the Tennessee River. This greenway connects Ditto Landing to the Madison County Marina. Parking is available at Ditto Landing. The City of Huntsville plans to extend the greenway south along the river and will end at the Flint River, where it will eventually connect to the Flint River greenway.

Wade Mountain Greenway

Proposed greenways
Barren Fork / Miller Branch - Southwest Huntsville near Huntsville International Airport that will connect Martin Road with Wheeler National Wildlife Refuge 
Betts Spring Branch Greenway - Southwest Huntsville. Along with a proposed Madison City greenway of the same name, will connect to Indian Creek Greenway and Cummings Research Park. 
Big Spring - Downtown Huntsville. This greenway will connect Big Spring Park to the Monte Sano Nature Preserve.
Blevins Gap - Hampton Cove/Jones Valley. This greenway will connect Big Cove Greenway to Blevins Gap Nature Preserve and Baliey Cove Road running along Cecil Asburn Drive.
Blue Spring Creek - Northwest Huntsville. 
Broglan North - Northwest Huntsville. 
Broglan South - West of Downtown Huntsville. This greenway will connect Holmes Avenue to Governors Drive.
Chapman Mountain - Northeast Huntsville. This greenway will connect Monte Sano State Park will Alabama A&M.
Dallas Branch - North of Downtown Huntsville.
Dry Creek Northwest Huntsville. This greenway will connect Providence and Indian Creek Greenway with Wade Mountain.
Huntsville Spring Branch - West Huntsville. This greenway will run north/south connecting Downtown with Ditto Landing.
Knox Creek - West Huntsville near Athens. This greenway will run south of Capshaw Road connecting Limestone Creek with Wall Triana Highway.
Limestone Creek - Limestone County. This greenway will run 14 miles, connecting East Limestone to Wheeler National Wildlife Refuge.
McDonald Creek - Southwest Huntsville. This greenway will connect U.S. Space and Rocket Center with John Hunt Park.
Pinhook II - North of Downtown. This greenway will run north from Big Spring Park to Sparkman Drive.
Smithers Mountain - Northeast Huntsville.
Spacewalk I - East Huntsville. This greenway will connect the Burritt Museum and Monte Sano State Park with Blevins Gap.
Spacewalk II - East Huntsville. This greenway will connect Blevins Gap (Blevins Gap Nature Preserve) with Madison County Nature Trail.
Spacewalk III - East Huntsville. This greenway will connect Madison County Nature Trail with Ditto Landing.
Wallace Mountain - Southeast Huntsville. This greenway will connect Spacewalk III with the Flint River.
Warparth Ridge - East Huntsville. This greenway will connect Monte Sano Nature Preserve with the Flint River.
Weatherly Mountain Greenway - South Huntsville.
Zierdt Road - West Huntsville.

Trails
Blevins Gap Nature Preserve offers 10.5 miles of hiking trails on 971.12 acres
Chapman Mountain Nature Preserve offers 3 miles of hiking trails with plans for 10 miles of trails
Madison County Nature Trail, located on Green Mountain, has  of walking trail around a large lake
 Monte Sano Nature Preserve, the green backdrop for the city of Huntsville, offers 1,107 acres and 23+ miles of public trails.
 Singing River Trail of North Alabama is a future 70-mile bicycling and walking trail that will connect Huntsville to multiple nearby cities.

Preserves

Goldsmith Schiffman Wildlife Sanctuary
The  Goldsmith Schiffman Wildlife Sanctuary is located in southeast Huntsville, near Hampton Cove, to the west of the Hays Nature Preserve.

Hays Nature Preserve
The Hays Nature Preserve, located in southeast Huntsville near the subdivision of Hampton Cove, is the city's largest and most undeveloped parklands. The Flint River and Big Cove Creek greenways run through the nature preserve and connect with various hiking trails along the way.

Monte Sano Nature Preserve 
Located on Monte Sano Mountain, Monte Sano Nature Preserve covers  making it one of the largest urban nature preserves in the US, larger than Central Park. This Preserve is managed in partnership with the Land Trust of North Alabama.

Wade Mountain Nature Preserve 
Wade Mountain Nature Preserve is a series of greenways and trails that make up  of walking and hiking trails in North Huntsville. This Preserve is managed in partnership with the Land Trust of North Alabama.

References

Protected areas of Madison County, Alabama
Tourist attractions in Huntsville, Alabama
Culture of Huntsville, Alabama
Parks in Huntsville, Alabama
Greenways